The Star Wars Mini Movie Awards a.k.a. The Artoos a.k.a. Episode 3 Inches was a filmmaking competition held in the UK by Hasbro. The rules stated that filmmakers had to make an animation using Star Wars action figures of no more than five minutes. There were three awards - Best Creativity, Best Storyline and Best Use of Characters, and two age categories, Padawan (15 years and under) and Jedi (16 years and over). Two finalists were picked for each category by a judging panel consisting of 20th Century Fox Home Entertainment, Cartoon Network, Empire magazine and Rampage magazine. All of the finalists were also put forward for the overall award of 'Best Star Wars Mini Movie'.
The awards ceremony was originally to have taken place in Central London, but instead was held at the Memorabilia show at the National Exhibition Centre in Birmingham. Taking place on 13 August 2006 category winners were given a trophy, £250 and a collection of Star Wars toys. The winner of 'Best Star Wars Mini Movie' received a trophy, £1000 and a home entertainment system.

Awards
Best Star Wars Mini Movie
Winner: Dan Masen (Star Wars: The Phantom Medallists)

Best Creativity (Jedi)
Winner: Michael Dobbin and Peter Kambasis (The Carbon Freeze Sequence)
Runner up: Dave Frear (Star Wars: The Cantina)

Best Storyline (Jedi)
Winner: John Meins (The Lucas Paradox)
Runner up: unknown by article creator - please update

Best Use of Characters (Jedi)
Winner: Dan Masen (Star Wars: The Phantom Medallists)
Runner up: Paul Rowley and John Collier (Star Wars : Saturday Night At-At The Movies)

Best Creativity (Padawn)
Winner: Ben Crane (Star Wars: The Ultimate Mission)
Runner up: unknown by article creator - please update

Best Storyline (Padawan)
Winner: Toby Manhire (Honey I Shrunk The Star Wars)
Runner up: unknown by article creator - please update

Best Use of Characters (Padawan)
Winner: Nathan Hussein (Happy Birthday Emperor!)
Runner up: unknown by article creator - please update

2007 Awards
For the 2007 awards (dubbed Lightsaber, Camera, Action) entrants were required to make a short film of no more than one minute that featured someone using the Hasbro Force Action Lightsaber. This time there will be only two awards, Best Film (Jedi) and Best Film (Padawan). The winners will receive a limited edition Chrome Force Action Lightsaber and a Sony DCR-HC27 camcorder. All finalists will receive a collection of Hasbro Star Wars toy. The judging panel is made up of representatives from Cartoon Network, Empire and Toxic. The awards ceremony was due to be held in November.

See also
The Official Star Wars Fan Film Awards

References

External links
 Star Wars Mini Movie Awards website
 The Lightsabre Interview: Dan Mason
 Star Wars: The Phantom Medallists at YouTube
 The Carbon Freeze Sequence at YouTube
 Star Wars: The Cantina at YouTube
 The Lucas Paradox at YouTube
 Star Wars: AT-AT The Movies at YouTube
 Happy Birthday Emperor! at YouTube

Fan films based on Star Wars
Science fiction awards